Kujendri is a small village of Rayagada district in the state of Odisha, India.
There is a Govt. High school of welfare department since 1949. The veteran Gandhian and Jamnalal Bajaj award winner  Biswanath Pattnaik came to kujendri in around 1940, founded  Banabasi Seva Samiti and worked for the development of local tribal people. The village is well known as the birthplace of the tribal lady freedom fighter Sandi Sabara. who met Sri Patnaik there and worked in the Bhoodan movement. Kujendri was an important place in the history of Bhoodan movement. The Bhoodan activists in a padayatra, in the leadership of Acharya Vinoba Bhave reached here on 8 March 1952 and mobilized the people of the area to donate lands.
It also has a temple-"Trinath temple", built by late shri Appana choudhury.

Demography
Kujendri is a tribal dominated village. The population of the village, as per India census 2011 is 3108, with 1594 males and 1514 females.

Geography
Kujendri is situated at lat.  and towards 43 km east of the dist. Headquarters as well as the nearest railway station Gunupur.

References

External links
Official website of Rayagada district

Cities and towns in Rayagada district
Villages in Rayagada district